Acada annulifer, the dark axehead skipper, is a butterfly in the family Hesperiidae. It is found in Nigeria, Cameroon, Gabon and the Democratic Republic of the Congo. The habitat consists of forests.

References

Butterflies described in 1892
Erionotini
Butterflies of Africa